George Joseph Folsey Jr. (born January 17, 1939) is an American film producer, editor, assistant director and cinematographer who frequently worked with director John Landis in the 1980s. Folsey was acquitted in a manslaughter case brought over the deaths of actor Vic Morrow and two children in a helicopter accident on the set of Twilight Zone: The Movie.  Folsey is the son of George J. Folsey and father of editor Ryan Folsey.

Significant collaborations

With John Landis
Folsey Jr. edited or co-edited six Landis films: all productions from Schlock (1973) to The Blues Brothers (1980), Thriller and Coming to America. Folsey produced eleven films directed or co-directed by Landis (Schlock, The Blues Brothers, all films from An American Werewolf in London to Coming to America). He was also second unit director collaborated with Landis during his Trading Places, Into the Night and Three Amigos. His son, editor Ryan Folsey appeared in Landis's first feature film Schlock. Folsey's name is mentioned in a scene in Trading Places when Louis Winthorpe gives his coat to the coat attendant and says "Good morning Folsey."

Selected filmography
He was producer for all films unless otherwise noted.

Film

As editor

Editorial department

Second unit director or assistant Director

As an actor

As cinematographer

Miscellaneous crew

Thanks

Television

As editor

References

External links

American film producers
American film editors
Living people
People acquitted of manslaughter
Place of birth missing (living people)
1939 births